The 1991 Canadian census was a detailed enumeration of the Canadian population. Census day was June 4, 1991. On that day, Statistics Canada attempted to count every person in Canada. The total population count of Canada was 27,296,859. This was a 7.9% increase over the 1986 census of 25,309,331.

The previous census was the 1986 census and the following census was in 1996 census.

Canada by the numbers

A summary of information about Canada.

Population by province

References

Censuses in Canada
1991 censuses
1991 in Canada